Donna McCannell (born 20 May 1950) is a Canadian speed skater. She competed in the women's 500 metres at the 1972 Winter Olympics.

References

1950 births
Living people
Canadian female speed skaters
Olympic speed skaters of Canada
Speed skaters at the 1972 Winter Olympics
Speed skaters from Winnipeg